Gilman School  is an all-boys independent school located in the Roland Park neighborhood of Baltimore, Maryland. There are three school divisions: Lower School, grades pre-kindergarten through five; Middle School, grades six through eight; and Upper School, grades nine through twelve. Founded in 1897 as the Country School for Boys, it was the first country day school in the US. It is named for Daniel Coit Gilman, the first president of Johns Hopkins University and an early supporter of efforts by Anne Galbraith Carey to form an all-boys day school.

Gilman enrolls approximately 1,000 students, ranging from pre-kindergarten to 12th grade, under the instruction of 146 faculty members. It is a member of the Association of Independent Maryland Schools and the Maryland Interscholastic Athletic Association.

Described by author C. Fraser Smith as "Baltimore's most prestigious preparatory academy," It has strong academic and athletic reputations. In 2002, Worth Magazine rated Gilman among the top 30 feeder schools in the US, signifying the high rate of matriculation by Gilman graduates at top colleges and universities. Its graduates are known to be intensely loyal to the school. Examining the school's 2010 data, it was noted approximately 75% of the Board of Trustees were graduates of the school, one of the highest percentages of any educational institution in the US.  Of Gilman's 16 varsity athletic programs, 15 have won conference championships since 2000, and in recent years its football, track & field, and lacrosse teams have appeared at or near the top of national rankings.

Prominent graduates of Gilman include author Walter Lord, sportswriter Frank Deford, Arizona Governor Fife Symington, Maryland Governor Bob Ehrlich, US Senator Daniel Brewster, US Congressman John Sarbanes, and composer Christopher Rouse.

History
Gilman was founded as The Country School for Boys by Baltimore resident Anne Galbraith Carey, with assistance from Daniel Coit Gilman (1831–1908, the first president of Johns Hopkins University, 1876–1908). The school opened its doors on September 30, 1897, in the old "Homewood" Mansion (now known as the Homewood Museum, off North Charles Street, constructed 1800 in Georgian-Federal style architecture, for Charles Carroll Jr. (1775–1825), also known as Charles Carroll of Homewood, son of Charles Carroll of Carrollton (1737–1832), last surviving signer of the Declaration of Independence).  By 1910, J.H.U. began moving its campus north from its former downtown location along North Howard Street by Little Ross, West Centre and West Monument Streets, in the neighborhood of Mount Vernon-Belvedere to the newly named "Homewood" campus and constructing its first campus buildings of similar matching Georgian - Federal styles. In 1910, the Country School moved to its current 68-acre (275,000 m²) campus further north in the city to Roland Park, along Roland Avenue, just south of the Belvedere Avenue (and the future Northern Parkway). Here was begun one of the first planned suburban developments in America by the new Roland Park Company in 1891. At that time the institution changed its name to "The Gilman Country School for Boys", in honor of the seminal figure in its founding, Dr. Gilman. In 1951, "Country" was dropped from the name.

Gilman has two sister schools: Bryn Mawr School, across Northern Parkway from Gilman to the north and Roland Park Country School, across Roland Ave to the west.  All three schools coordinate some Upper School (grades 9–12) classes to the extent that some classes have students from all three schools.

Academics
The school has three divisions: Lower School (pre-kindergarten through grade five), Middle School (grades six through eight) and Upper School (grades nine through twelve).
At the Upper School level, students are required to take courses in history, mathematics, English, science, and a foreign language each semester; an intramural or interscholastic sport each season; and a minimum of art, music, and religion instruction over four years. Students must also fulfill a community service requirement and may choose to participate in a range of extracurricular activities. Gilman's Science, technology, engineering, and mathematics (STEM) program was ranked #312 in Newsweek's 2019 nationwide survey of  US high schools.

A number of courses permit cross-registration by students from two neighboring girls' schools: Bryn Mawr and Roland Park Country School. In turn, Gilman students, primarily seniors, are able to enroll in equivalent courses at these sister schools. Starting junior year, students are allowed to take necessary classes like English and other subjects at the sister schools. The school offers numerous courses, several through the tri-school collaboration. Cross-registration also allows for a variety of languages to be offered, which currently include French, Spanish, Latin, Ancient Greek, Chinese, Russian, Arabic, and German.

Athletics
Gilman enjoys a tradition of athletic success. Since the year 2000, 12 Gilman varsity teams have won at least one conference championship. Overall, the school sponsors 16 sports; most teams have varsity and junior varsity programs, while some have fresh-soph and/or middle school squads.

Gilman is perhaps best known for its success in football, lacrosse, and tennis. The football team has won 13 Maryland Interscholastic Athletic Association (MIAA) "A" Conference championships in the last 20 seasons. The 2002 team finished 10–0 and was ranked 14th in the United States by USA Today's Super 25 high school football poll. That team featured the Associated Press's Offensive and Defensive Player of the Year in quarterback Ambrose Wooden and lineman Victor Abiamiri. Both players went on to star at Notre Dame, and Abiamiri played five seasons for the Philadelphia Eagles. The 2005 team was ranked 12th in the nation in USA Today's Super 25 high school football poll.

The lacrosse team, led by coach, upper school history teacher, and Gilman alumnus (Class of 1987) Brooks Matthews, was ranked the #1 high school team in the United States by LaxPower at the conclusion of both the 2008 and 2009 seasons. The team has captured 16 MSA & MIAA "A" conference titles. The lacrosse program has produced many stars in college lacrosse.

Former top-50 professional tennis player Steve Krulevitz is the varsity tennis head coach at the school, where he led the team to a 12th-place finish at the high school national championships in Kentucky, and a 16th-place finish at the 2016 National Invitational Boys High School Team Tennis Tournament, in Newport Beach, California. He also led the team to seven consecutive A Conference titles in the Maryland Interscholastic Athletic Association.

During the 2005–06 school year, six Gilman varsity squads (football, golf, ice hockey, squash, tennis & track and field) won conference titles. In 2008–09, the volleyball team won its first MIAA title, while the squash and swimming teams also won conference championships.

Gilman's biggest rival is the McDonogh School, located in suburban Owings Mills. A football game between the two schools has taken place every fall since 1914. Gilman leads this series, 61-38-5, including a win in the 100th game in 2015.

Interscholastic programs

Fall offerings
Cross country
Football
Soccer
Volleyball
Water polo

Winter offerings
 Basketball
 Ice hockey
 Indoor track
 Squash
 Swimming
 Wrestling

Spring offerings
Baseball
Golf
Lacrosse
Tennis
Track and field

Championship seasons
Gilman's varsity athletic teams have won over 120 championships since 1940, including 41 conference titles since the MIAA was formed in 1994. The school currently competes in the association's highest grouping, or "A" conference, in every sport except for ice hockey.

Awards

Gilman confers over 50 awards at the upper school level for achievement in academics, athletics, student leadership, and extracurricular activities. Most prizes are bestowed on seniors; a smaller number are granted to underclassmen by design or as circumstances warrant. The majority are given on Awards Day, held each year in late May, while a handful of the highest honors are withheld until Founders Day, the day of Gilman's commencement ceremonies.

 The William A. Fisher Medallion is accorded to a junior or senior "who has rendered the highest service that can be rendered the School by leadership based on the influence of character."
 The William S. Thomas Scholarship Prize, consists of seven awards: six given to the top scholar of grades 8 to 12 and one for the valedictorian, as determined by academic achievement over the course of four years.
 The William Cabell Bruce Jr. Athletic Prize honors the upper school student "most conspicuous for general proficiency in athletic sports and exercises over a two-year period."
 The Daniel Baker Jr. Memorial is awarded to the senior who "through thoughtfulness and by reason of his character, has contributed to the general welfare of his fellow men."
 The Edward Fenimore Award recognizes the senior who has best exemplified the characteristics of "courage, determination, perseverance, and accomplishment."
 The Peter Parrott Blanchard Award is given to the upper school student who "by his cheerful helpfulness ... has greatly contributed to the successful and pleasant life in the School."
 The Redmond C. S. Finney Award celebrates the student who has distinguished himself "through his dedication to and practice of those human values necessary to eliminate racism, prejudice, and intolerance."
 The Daniel C. Ammidon Award recognizes students in grades 6-12 for their "outstanding citizenship and commitment to the Gilman Community."

Leadership

Notable alumni

Victor Abiamiri, defensive end for the Philadelphia Eagles (National Football League)
John P. Angelos, Executive Vice President of the Baltimore Orioles
Scott Bartlett, guitar player for the band Saving Abel
Daniel Brewster, U.S. senator from Maryland
Thomas Booker, Defensive End for the Houston Texans  and Stanford University 
C. Justin Brown, criminal defense attorney representing Adnan Syed, who was the subject of the first season of the podcast Serial in 2014.
Ryan Boyle, attackman for the New York Titans (National Lacrosse League)
William P. Carey, American philanthropist and businessman, founder of W. P. Carey & Co., donated the funds to establish the Carey Business School at Johns Hopkins University, the Carey School of Law at the University of Maryland, and the W. P. Carey School of Business at Arizona State University. 
Brandon Copeland, LB for the Atlanta Falcons. Played college football for the University of Pennsylvania.
Frank Deford, author, commentator for National Public Radio, and senior contributing writer for Sports Illustrated
Conor Doyle, former team captain and attack for the Notre Dame men's lacrosse team
Bob Ehrlich, former Governor of Maryland and former U.S. Representative from Maryland's 2nd congressional district
Brian Ferentz, assistant coach for the New England Patriots, and former offensive lineman for the Atlanta Falcons
Mark Fetting, former president and CEO of Legg Mason
Redmond C. S. Finney, Gilman School Headmaster 1968–1992. Finney and Jim Brown are the only two people in the history of NCAA to be first team All-American in two sports in the same academic year. Each was All-American in both football and lacrosse.
Fritz Haller and Lecky Haller, world champions and olympians in whitewater canoe
Hall Hammond, chief judge of the Maryland Court of Appeals
Darius Jennings, former wide receiver for the University of Virginia, NFL player
Cyrus Jones, cornerback for the Denver Broncos.  Played college football for the University of Alabama
Kevin B. Kamenetz, Baltimore County Executive
Ensign C. Markland Kelly Jr., War hero, lacrosse player
David Kim, founder of C2 Education
Bradley King, lighting designer, won Tony award for his work on the Broadway musical Natasha, Pierre & the Great Comet of 1812
Micah Kiser, Inside Linebacker for LA Rams former Inside Linebacker for the University of Virginia, 2017 William V. Campbell Trophy recipient
Walter Lord, author of A Night to Remember
Christopher Minkowski, Boden Professor of Sanskrit at the University of Oxford.
John W. Nicholson Jr., leader military operations in Afghanistan, former commander of NATO's allied land command
Timothy Parker, crossword editor of USA Today and Guinness World Record holder for syndicated puzzles
Colin Pine, former interpreter to Yao Ming of the Houston Rockets (National Basketball Association)
Greg Plitt, actor/fitness celebrity and former United States Army Ranger
Biff Poggi, investment manager and football coach
Christopher Rouse, composer
John Sarbanes, U.S. Representative from Maryland's 3rd congressional district
Mark Schuster, Dean and Founding CEO, Kaiser Permanente Bernard J. Tyson School of Medicine
Jeff Seibert, Senior Director of Product at Twitter, Co-Founder and CEO of Crashlytics (acquired by Twitter for over $100 million)
Mark Shapiro, President and CEO of the Toronto Blue Jays
Gavin Sheets, baseball player
Stuart O. Simms, former Maryland Secretary of Public Safety and Correctional Services
Charles Francis Stein, champion sailboat skipper
Fife Symington, former Governor of Arizona
Jon Theodore, former drummer for The Mars Volta
Christopher Van Hollen Sr. (1941), former United States Ambassador to Sri Lanka and the Maldives from 1972 to 1976

References

External links

Gilman School website
Gilman School Instagram

Private schools in Baltimore
Preparatory schools in Maryland
Private K-12 schools in Maryland
Educational institutions established in 1897
Roland Park, Baltimore
1897 establishments in Maryland